Frederick C. Clay (November 23, 1874 – October 12, 1917) was an American professional baseball player who played in three games for the Philadelphia Phillies in .  He scored one run and recorded one RBI on two hits compiling a career .250 batting average.
He was born in Baltimore, Maryland and died at the age of 42 in York, Pennsylvania.

He began his professional career with the Meridian Silverites of the Connecticut State League in 1900.  His best year in the minors was 1905, when he had a batting average of .384 in 111 games with two teams.  After his appearance in the Major Leagues, he continued to play minor league baseball.  His last year in the minors was 1915 with the Chambersburg Maroons, Gettysburg Patriots, Fitchburg Burghers and Worcester Busters.

External links

Major League Baseball left fielders
Baseball players from Baltimore
Philadelphia Phillies players
1874 births
1917 deaths
Minor league baseball managers
Meriden Silverites players
Meriden Miler players
York Penn Parks players
Louisville Colonels (minor league) players
Harrisburg Senators players
York White Rozes players
Reading Pretzels players
Trenton Tigers players
York White Roses players
Lancaster Red Roses players
Chambersburg Maroons players
Gettysburg Patriots players
Fitchburg Burghers players
Worcester Busters players